FlyDamas Airlines was a Syrian airline based at Damascus International Airport. Using a single Boeing 737-300 aircraft, it operated scheduled flights to Iraq, Kuwait, Syria and Sudan.

History 
FlyDamas had planned to launch flights on 1 April and 1 November 2015; however, this did not occur. The airline operated its first flight on 10 December 2015 between Damascus and Qamishli. Although it was planning flights to many destinations, FlyDamas initially only operated flights to Qamishli. For this reason, the airline may be affiliated with the Syrian government and may have been transporting supplies to the city for the Syrian Army.

FlyDamas began flights to various countries in the Middle East and Africa, using a Boeing 737-500 leased from Alexandria Airlines. However in November 2016 they acquired their own Boeing 737-300. In August 2017, FlyDamas began to lease a freighter Boeing 737-400 from Mid Africa Aviation for dedicated cargo.

As of January 2021, the airline suspended operations with plans to resume its services.

Corporate affairs 
FlyDamas was owned by Ammar A-Kadri and managed by Samer Al-Dehni, former commercial director of Cham Wings Airlines. He says the goal of FlyDamas was to lend support to its "mother company", Syrian Air, which is under sanctions amid the Syrian Civil War.

Destinations 
FlyDamas flies to the following destinations as of November 2016:

Fleet
The FlyDamas fleet consists of the following aircraft as of August 2017:

FlyDamas has also operated the following aircraft:

See also
 List of airlines of Syria

References

External links 
 

Airlines of Syria
Airlines established in 2013
2013 establishments in Syria
Companies based in Damascus
Syrian brands